Eupeodes nitens  is a Palearctic species of hoverfly.

Description
Resembles other Eupeodes. Determination is problematic. Key references are Van der Goot,V.S. (1981)  The adult insect is illustrated in colour by Stubbs and Falk (1983).

Distribution and biology
It is found from Fennoscandia south to the Pyrenees and from England eastwards through Central and Southern into Siberia and the Russian Far East on to the Pacific coast in Fagus forest and alpine grassland from May August.

References

External links
 Images representing Eupeodes nitens

Diptera of Europe
Syrphini
Insects described in 1843